Andre Omar King (born November 26, 1973) is a former American football wide receiver in the National Football League. He was drafted by the Cleveland Browns in the seventh round of the 2001 NFL Draft. He played for the Cleveland Browns from 2001 to 2004. He went to the University of Miami for college. He also played baseball in the MLB's Atlanta Braves and Cincinnati Reds farm systems.

King attended Stranahan High School in Fort Lauderdale, Florida and was a letterman in football and baseball. In football, he was an All-County selection and an All-State selection. In baseball, as a senior, he posted a .492 batting average with seven home runs, and 30 stolen bases.

He is now the Head Football Coach and Athletic Director at Loganville Christian Academy in Loganville, Georgia.

References

External links
Baseball stats

1973 births
Living people
Sportspeople from Kingston, Jamaica
Jamaican players of American football
American football wide receivers
Players of American football from Florida
Miami Hurricanes football players
Cleveland Browns players
Jamaican baseball players
Baseball outfielders
Danville Braves players
Macon Braves players
Durham Bulls players
Prince William Cannons players
Winston-Salem Warthogs players
Chattanooga Lookouts players
St. Petersburg Devil Rays players